Phú Xuân is the name of a historical capital of Vietnam, which is now the city of Huế. 

Phú Xuân may also refer to several other places in Vietnam:

 , a rural commune of Nhà Bè District, Ho Chi Minh City
 , a rural commune of Thái Bình city
 Phú Xuân, An Giang, a rural commune of Phú Tân District
 , a rural commune of Krông Năng District
 , a rural commune of Tân Phú District
 , a rural commune of Quan Hóa, Thanh Hóa Province
 , a rural commune of Thọ Xuân, Thanh Hóa Province
 , a rural commune of Phú Vang District
 , a rural commune of Bình Xuyên District

See also
Xuân Phú (disambiguation)